

Heinrich Krampf (1 September 1888 – 16 November 1963) was commander of the 16th Infantry Division and the 304. Infanterie-Division during World War II.

References
Citations

Bibliography

 Mitcham Jr., Samuel W (2000). The Panzer Legions: A Guide to the German Army Tank Divisions of World War II and Their Commanders. Westport, CT: Greenwood Press, .

1888 births
1963 deaths
Military personnel from Würzburg
Recipients of the clasp to the Iron Cross, 1st class
German Army personnel of World War I
Lieutenant generals of the German Army (Wehrmacht)
People from the Kingdom of Bavaria
German Army generals of World War II
Recipients of the Hanseatic Cross